Ghana–Jamaica relations refers to the bilateral relations between Ghana and Jamaica. Both nations are members of the United Nations, however neither country has a resident ambassador.

Ghana and Jamaica have a Joint Permanent Commission, and there are plans for Ghanaian investment in Jamaica.

History
Ghana, as the former Gold Coast, and Jamaica share historical links through the slave trade and forced Ashanti/Akan emigration to the Caribbean.

References

 
Jamaica
Bilateral relations of Jamaica
Jamaica
Ghana